Clypeaster rosaceus, the fat sea biscuit, is a species of sea urchin in the family Clypeasteridae. It occurs in shallow water in the western Atlantic Ocean and was first scientifically described in 1758 by Carl Linnaeus.

Description
In shape it is ovate to slightly pentagonal, with the margin thicker at the anterior end. The petaloid area is broad, the anterior (front) petal being longer than the two posterior, paired petals, which are all of equal length; the area between the pores is wide and raised above the rest of the aboral (upper) surface. The oral (under) surface is fairly flat, with a deep depression around the mouth, and with deeply indented food grooves. The anus is on the oral surface near the posterior margin. The spines are short and coarse. When alive, this species is a dark brown colour, while the bare test is whitish.

Distribution and habitat
The species is found in the western Atlantic Ocean. Its range extends from South Carolina to the West Indies, Barbados, Texas and Venezuela.

Ecology
C. rosaceus lives on the surface of sandy seabeds and is nocturnal. It feeds on fragments of dead plant material and algae particularly among seagrass plants. In the process of feeding it grinds up sand particles with its Aristotle's lantern mouthparts, and it has been estimated that it reduces  of coarse particles of sediment into fine particles in the course of a year. During the daytime it is inactive and buries itself or covers its test with fragments of shell and pieces of seagrass, holding these in place with its tube feet.

In Panama, breeding takes place annually in the rainy season, with spawn being liberated into the sea. The eggs contain much yolk to sustain the developing larvae, which settle on the seabed and undergo metamorphosis after about six days.

References

External links

Animals described in 1758
Clypeaster
Taxa named by Carl Linnaeus